Shawnee Smith (born July 3, 1969) is an American actress and singer. She is known for playing Linda in the CBS sitcom Becker and  Amanda Young from the Saw franchise. She was part of the country rock band, Smith & Pyle. She hosted season one the VH1 acting competition Scream Queens.

Smith began her acting career at a young age, making her feature film debut at age 11 in John Huston's Annie, playing one of the orphans. A few years later, she made her stage debut in To Gillian on Her 37th Birthday and won a Drama-League Critics Award. In the late 1980s, she was cast in smaller roles before getting her first starring role in the remake of The Blob (1988) and a supporting role in the film Who's Harry Crumb? (1989).

In the 1990's she made guest appearances on Murder, She Wrote and The X-Files before being cast in a main role of the sitcom Becker (1998–2004). In 2004, she played Amanda in Saw and reprises her role in the sequels, Saw II (2005), Saw III (2006), and Saw VI (2009).  She played Jennifer Goodson in Anger Management from 2012 to 2014 in 100 episodes. Smith will appear in Saw X, scheduled to be released in October 2023.

Early life
Smith was born on July 3, 1969 at Orangeburg Regional Hospital in Orangeburg, South Carolina. She is the second child of Patricia Ann (née Smoak), an oncology nurse, and James H. Smith, a financial planner and former US Air Force pilot. When she was five months old, her family relocated from South Carolina to West Los Angeles, California. Her parents divorced when she was two years old and her mother remarried five years later when they moved to San Fernando Valley.

Career

1978–1995: Early roles in stage, television and film 
Smith made her television debut in a McDonald's commercial at age eight.  At age 11, she made her feature film debut in John Huston's 1982 adaptation of the Broadway musical Annie, as one of Annie Bennett Warbucks's fellow orphans. The next year, she sang on The Merv Griffin Show.  At age 15, Smith won her first stage role in the Los Angeles play, To Gillian on Her 37th Birthday where co-star Richard Dreyfuss noticed in rehearsals her potential and suggested she be given a leading part. She went on to win the Drama-League Critics Award for her performance. 

In 1985, she had small parts in, Not My Kid, Cagney & Lacey  and Iron Eagle (1986). In 1987, Smith played a pregnant student Rhonda in Summer School. The following year, her first starring role came with the remake of The Blob.  In 1988, Smith starred in television film I Saw What You Did, a remake of the 1965 film of the same name. 

Smith had a supporting role alongside Annie Potts in the 1989 film Who's Harry Crumb?, where Smith plays a teen who helps Harry Crumb locate her kidnapped sister. That same year, she co-starred with Jennie Garth and Barbara Eden in the short-lived TV series Brand New Life. The following year, she co-starred in Michael Cimino's remake of the thriller Desperate Hours. She took a three-year break from acting in the early 1990s, primarily because she had outgrown teenage roles and had a hard time finding work. She made a guest appearance on the 200th episode of Murder, She Wrote in 1993. That following year, she played Julie Lawry in the television miniseries The Stand, based on the novel by Stephen King. Smith made a guest appearance in the 1994 The X-Files episode "Firewalker", playing Jessie O'Neil.

1998–2006: Breakthrough with Becker and the Saw franchise 

In 1998, Smith was cast as Linda in CBS's sitcom Becker, playing the office's aide of Dr. John Becker (Ted Danson). After airing three episodes to high ratings, CBS ordered a full season. She was a main character for all six seasons until its cancellation in 2004.  In 2003, she lent her voice to an episode of the Disney cartoon Kim Possible as Vivian Porter. 

In 2003, she was cast in James Wan's low budget horror film, Saw, as Amanda Young. A small part, opposite Tobin Bell, she filmed her scene within one day and while battling the flu. While initially a direct-to-video release was planned, test screenings in March 2004 turned out positive prompting Lionsgate to release it theatrically that October.  It became a box office success, grossing $103 million worldwide and receiving mixed reviews from critics.  She would reprise her role in Saw II (2005), Saw III (2006) and Saw VI (2009). The Saw franchise went on to become one of the highest-grossing horror franchises of all time, grossing over $1 billion worldwide, as of 2021.

2010–present: Continued work and other ventures 
In 2006, Smith made an appearance in the 10-minute short film trailer Repo! The Genetic Opera, directed by Bousman. The trailer was filmed after completing Saw III to try to pitch the idea to film producers. In 2008, Smith played Detective Gina Harcourt in the FEARnet original series 30 Days of Night: Dust to Dust and also served as executive producer. It premiered in July 17 with six webisodes.  Smith was the host and one of three mentors on the VH1 reality television series, Scream Queens, which aired from October 2008 to December 2008. Smith did not return for the second season due to scheduling conflicts and was replaced with Jaime King.

Smith played the role of Dr. Sullivan, child psychiatrist, in The Grudge 3 that was released direct-to-video on May 12, 2009.  She appeared in the series premiere of Law & Order: Los Angeles titled, "Hollywood", on September 29, 2010. In 2012, she had her first voice role in a video game, Lollipop Chainsaw. From 2012 to 2014, Smith starred as Jennifer Goodson, the ex-wife of Charlie Sheen's character in the TV series Anger Management. 

Smith co-starred with Dean Winters in the 2021 indie comedy film Christmas vs. the Walters. Smith will once again reprise her role as Amanda in the tentatively titled, Saw X, scheduled for release in October 2023.  She will co-star in another horror film, The Skulleton, also planned to be released in October.

Music career
Smith began working on a solo album in 2004 with producer Chris Goss, but the project was never completed. In an interview with Radio Free in October 2005, she stated, "between being a mom, and working, and growing another baby, I have not had time to give attention to music for a while." She provided vocals on a cover of Steve Miller Band's "Abracadabra" by Eagles of Death Metal after Jesse Hughes overheard her singing the song in a studio bathroom. This cover was released in 2019.

Smith contributed to the soundtrack of Saw III in 2006 with vocals on Hydrovibe's song "Killer Inside", and to the soundtrack for Catacombs as a solo vocalist with the song "Please Myself". 

In 2007, she was part of a country rock music group with actress Missi Pyle called Smith & Pyle.  Their first album, It's OK to Be Happy, was released digitally through iTunes and Amazon.com in 2008.

Personal life
Smith was married to photographer Jason Reposar and have a daughter, born 1999. She was later married to musician Kai Mattoon; they divorced and have a son, born 2005.

Credits

Film

Television

References

External links

 
 
 

Living people
Actresses from South Carolina
American child actresses
American women country singers
American country singer-songwriters
Country musicians from South Carolina
American film actresses
American heavy metal singers
American stage actresses
American television actresses
American women heavy metal singers
People from Orangeburg, South Carolina
20th-century American actresses
21st-century American actresses
Converts to Eastern Orthodoxy from Lutheranism
Eastern Orthodox Christians from the United States
North Hollywood High School alumni
Singer-songwriters from South Carolina
Women punk rock singers
1969 births